The 1962 Chicago White Sox season was the team's 62nd season in the major leagues, and its 63rd season overall. They finished with a record of 85–77, good enough for fifth place in the American League, 11 games behind the first-place New York Yankees.

Offseason 
 November 27, 1961: Minnie Miñoso was traded by the White Sox to the St. Louis Cardinals for Joe Cunningham.
 November 28, 1961: Roy Sievers was traded by the White Sox to the Philadelphia Phillies for Charley Smith and John Buzhardt.
 March 24, 1962: Andy Carey was traded by the White Sox to the Los Angeles Dodgers for Ramón Conde and Jim Koranda (minors).
 Prior to 1962 season: Future basketball star Dave DeBusschere was signed as an amateur free agent by the White Sox.

Regular season 
 April 22, 1962: Dave DeBusschere made his major league baseball debut in a game against the Kansas City Athletics. He pitched one inning and gave up one walk.

Opening Day lineup 
 Luis Aparicio, SS
 Nellie Fox, 2B
 Joe Cunningham, 1B
 Floyd Robinson, RF
 Al Smith, LF
 Mike Hershberger, CF
 Charley Smith, 3B
 Sherm Lollar, C
 Juan Pizarro, P

Season standings

Record vs. opponents

Roster

Player stats

Batting 
Note: G=Games played; AB=At bats; R=Runs scored; H=Hits; 2B=Doubles; 3B=Triples; HR=Home runs; RBI=Runs batted in; BB=Base on balls; SO=Strikeouts; AVG=Batting average; SB=Stolen bases

Pitching 
Note: W=Wins; L=Losses; ERA=Earned run average; G=Games pitched; GS=Games started; SV=Saves; IP=Innings pitched; H=Hits allowed; R=Runs allowed; ER=Earned runs allowed; HR=Home runs allowed; BB=Walks allowed; K=Strikeouts

Farm system 

Savannah franchise moved to Lynchburg, August 26, 1962; Harlan affiliation shared with New York Yankees

Notes

External links 
 1962 Chicago White Sox at Baseball Reference

Chicago White Sox seasons
Chicago White Sox season
Chicago